The American Show Racer pigeon (also known as the Show Pen Racer, and nicknamed the "Bird of Dignity.") is a breed of domestic pigeon that began in the early 1950s with the finest Racing Homers, selectively bred for their breed type. Pigeon historian Wendell Levi mentions Show Pen Racers in his book The Pigeon. He describes the early development of the breed in the United States and early breeders of the variety. In 1952, The American Show Pen Racer Club was formed at the National Show held in Des Moines, Iowa.

As years passed, the word “pen” was removed from the club name and it was officially changed to The American Show Racer Association (ASRA).

As the breed developed, the standard was updated and in the year 2000, a new standard drawing was created and accepted by vote of the membership. Emphasis is placed on "station" (which includes an upright posture) and a powerful head. The bird should be very smooth-feathered.

The ASRA currently has approximately 150 members in 37 US states and seven other countries. It is an affiliate club of the National Pigeon Association.

The breed is popular at shows. In November 2007, at the Pageant of Pigeons held in San Bernardino, California, approximately 150 were entered by 15 exhibitors.

See also
 Pigeon racing
 Homing pigeon
 List of pigeon breeds

References

External links

 http://www.americanshowracer.com
 http://show-racer.forumactif.com/index.htm
 http://www.npausa.com
 http://www.purebredpigeon.com

Pigeon breeds originating in the United States
Pigeon racing
Pigeon breeds